The Proud Family Movie is a 2005 American animated comedy television film based on the Disney Channel animated series, The Proud Family. It premiered on August 19, 2005 and serves as the finale to the show’s original run.

The events of the film are non-canon with the rest of the series, with one of the most notable issues being Penny's inconsistent age. The Proud Family: Louder and Prouder retcons the movie as a dream in the episode "Us Again".

Plot
Penny Proud is about to celebrate her 16th birthday, and she is excited for herself and her friends to be part of a dance group led by 15 Cent since he's Sticky's cousin. However, when 15 Cent drives Penny home, her father Oscar gets angry when he finds them kissing. Overreacting on this, Oscar grounds Penny indefinitely and cancels her birthday, which leaves Penny very furious as she outrageously resents Oscar for being her father.

In the meantime, Oscar manages to create a serum that can make his Proud Snacks tastier, but it instead causes the snack to expand and explode. As he is hauled away following his failed presentation, he protests that his formula has no expiration date, which is overheard by a man named Dr. Carver, who has been trying to create an army of humanoid peanuts but never got his formula stabilized. Plotting to nab the formula, Carver invites the Proud family to his home in Legume Island. Trudy forces Oscar and Penny to go, hoping they will bond in spite of their issues. Upon arrival, the Prouds meet the G-nomes, dwarf-sized creatures made from peanuts and Penny wants peanuts from the minibar.

Carver tries to negotiate obtaining the formula from Oscar, but when Oscar refuses, Carver reveals he has created peanut clones of his family from DNA snatched from them while they were partying. Oscar runs away and tries explaining to his family, but they don't believe him. Meanwhile, the clones get a mix-up when the real Penny comes with them back to the mainland to search for the formula, while her clone remains with the original family. Penny soon enjoys the free life, which was encouraged by the clones, but eventually gets tired of it.

At that moment, a mysterious G-nome leads the Prouds and the Penny clone on a perilous journey to the other side of the island, saying there is someone who can answer their questions. Along the way, the Penny clone proves to be the kind of daughter that Oscar desires: obedient. When they meet the person that the G-nome wanted them to meet, he turns out to be the real Dr. Carver, who explains that the Dr. Carver that they met was actually a clone made of a peanut. Dr. Carver revealed that he created the G-nomes based on his research of peanuts. He created the Carver clone as a means of carrying out his research for the better of humankind, but the Carver clone went sizzling crisp in the sun one day and became evil. Donning a disguise of his original form, the Carver clone took over the island and enslaved the G-nomes, turning Carver's peanut research for evil. This makes Oscar realize that his formula is the key and tells the family he had left it in a locket for Penny's birthday, which she opens back home.

With this information, the Penny clone reveals herself by trapping the Prouds and the real Dr. Carver before informing the other clones, who take the formula after revealing their true nature to the real Penny. Realizing what just happened, Penny gathers her friends to head over to Legume Island and rescue her family. Unfortunately, the Carver clone has already used the formula to create and stabilize his peanut soldier army to conquer the world and has left on an air blimp. Anticipating that this would happen, Carver reveals that he has a container of gas that could instantly turn solid peanuts into peanut butter. Penny takes the container and boards on the blimp, intending to release it. Before she is about to, the Carver clone tries to convince her otherwise by offering her a life of complete freedom from her family. Though Penny admits that while she may have a lot of issues with her family (especially Oscar), she refuses the Carver clone's offer and unleashes the gas, melting the peanut soldier army and reverting the Carver clone back into a lifeless peanut.

With the Carver clone's plot finally foiled, the Prouds are declared heroes by the public, and Oscar gives Penny her birthday necklace before allowing her to attend the dance group with 15 Cent and her friends.

Cast
 Kyla Pratt as Penny Proud
 Tommy Davidson as Oscar Proud
 Paula Jai Parker as Dr. Trudy Proud
 Jo Marie Payton as Charlette "Suga Mama" Proud
 Tara Strong as Bebe & Cece Proud / Cashew
 Orlando Brown as Sticky Webb
 Soleil Moon Frye as Zoey Howser
 Alisa Reyes as LaCienega Boulevardez
 Karen Malina White as Dijonay Jones
 Omarion as 15 Cent
 LisaRaye McCoy as The Choreographer
 Arsenio Hall as Dr. Carver / Bobby Proud
 Jeremy Suarez as Wally
 Carlos Alazraqui as Puff The Dog / Board Member
 Billy West as Board Member / Cab Driver
 Carlos Mencia as Felix Boulevardez
 Maria Canals as Sunset Boulevardez
 Alvaro Guttierez as Papi
 Phil LaMarr as Dr. Carver In Disguise / Board Member
 Aries Spears as Wizard Kelly / Board Member
 Keith David as Bebe Proud Clone
 Kevin Michael Richardson as Mangler Mania / Bobo The Sea Beast
 Masi Oka as Japanese Kid / The Announcer

Soundtrack

The score to the film was composed by Elika Alvarez, Frank Fitzpatrick and Freddy Sheinfel. The film features new songs written by Frank Fitzpatrick, Jorge Corante, Robyn Johnson, Stephen Anderson and Jayne Houston, along with covers of calypso songs. The songs featured in the film are:

 "Blowin' Up the Spot" - Omarion Grandberry (Instrumental only) 
 "Right Here" - 'Jhené Aiko'
 "Boom Boom Boom" - Arsenio Hall (Dr. Carver and Bobby Proud)
 "If I Ruled the World" - Arsenio Hall (Dr. Carver and Bobby Proud)
 "Looking for the Perfect Beat" - Performed by Afrika Bambaatta & the Soulsonic Force
 "Together Makes it Better" - Kyla Pratt (Penny Proud), Alisa Reyes (LaCienga Boulevardez), Karen Malina White (Dijonay Jones) and Soleil Moon Frye (Zoey)

Release
The Proud Family Movie premiered on Disney Channel on August 19, 2005 and was released on VHS and DVD on December 6, 2005 with an extended ending.

In his 2020 autobiography, Tommy Davidson revealed that the cast on the original show quit after Disney paid them unfairly, but he convinced them to stay to complete a final season and a film before the series came to a close. In a February 2022 interview, Pratt revealed that she introduced her children to the series by showing them a DVD of the film since she didn't have access to episodes from the original series.

The film re-aired on Disney Channel on May 28, 2016, as part of Disney Channel's 100 DCOM Marathon to celebrate the 100th film, Adventures in Babysitting and again on April 5, 2021 as part of Disney Channel's Monday block DCOM and Dessert.

As of November 12, 2019, the film is available to stream on Disney+ and Prime Video.

The film is also included in the 7-disc complete collection which includes the show and Shorties to celebrate the 20th anniversary of the series. It was released on March 15, 2022 on DVD.

Reception
Reception to the film was mixed. Nancy Davis Kho of Common Sense Media argued that the film had a "weird plot" and gave it two out of five stars, saying that the movie's plot is so strange and has slow-moving parts that viewers may prefer to watch the "shorter and pithier TV episodes." Although Cho also called the movie "light on substance," she praised the character traits of the Proud family clones, fast-paced comedic dialogue, and rap music soundtrack. Some were even more critical, arguing that the film uses low-rent animation, an unpleasant look, cliches, stereotypes, and offensive characteristics, calling it an "entirely worthless endeavor." In contrast ET called the film 
a "childhood favorite." Bustle recommended the film, as one of those to bring you back to your childhood, and asked viewers to remember the "peanut dance battle scene." Kareem Gannett of Collider said that while the movie is as "sassy and bold" as the original series, the film is a "mess" in terms of its plot, even though it comes together in the end. Liv McConnell of Teen Vogue said that the movie, like the series, combined "cartoon-level absurdity" with a relatable slice-of-life stories. Black film scholar Debbie Olson criticized the movie for not having "ethnically rich" characters like Fat Albert and for stereotypes, but praised it for having all the Black characters as being affluent or middle class.

Awards and nominations

References

External links

 
 
 
 

2005 television films
2005 films
2005 animated films
2000s fantasy comedy films
Films based on television series
Disney Channel Original Movie films
2000s American animated films
Films about vacationing
Films about cloning
Films set on islands
African-American animated films
American science fiction television films
Mad scientist films
Television films based on television series
American children's animated comedy films
American children's animated fantasy films
American television series finales
Disney Television Animation films
Hyperion Pictures films
Films with screenplays by Stiles White
Animated films based on animated series